Leptoseps is a genus of rare skinks, lizards in the family Scincidae. The genus is endemic to Southeast Asia.

Geographic range
Species in the genus Leptoseps are found in Thailand and Vietnam.

Species
The following two species are recognized as being valid.
Leptoseps osellai  – Osella's skink (Thailand)
Leptoseps poilani  – (Vietnam)

References

Further reading
Greer AE (1997). "Leptoseps: A New Genus of Scincid Lizards from Southeast Asia". Journal of Herpetology 31 (3): 393–398.

 
Reptiles of Southeast Asia
Lizard genera
Taxa named by Allen Eddy Greer